Live! is Catch 22's first full-length live release, although fan-recorded live tracks were bonus features on several previous albums.  Roughly a third of the album is devoted to Keasbey Nights, another third to Alone in a Crowd, and the remainder to Dinosaur Sounds. A bonus DVD  includes footage from the concert, as well as a variety of extras. However, former frontman Tomas Kalnoky is conspicuously absent from the footage of the band's early days.

Track listing

DVD Features
Footage of August 30, 2004 concert.
Embarrassing Photos (Photos of band members acting foolish)
On the Road (Home video footage from the band's tour bus)
At the Show (Footage from earlier concerts filmed by fans)
Humble Beginnings (Home videos and old photographs of band members)
Music Videos: Wine Stained Lips, Point the Blame, Hard to Impress

Personnel
Pat Kays - bass guitar
Ian McKenzie - trombone, vocals
Ryan Eldred - saxophone, vocals
Chris Greer - drum kit
Kevin Gunther - trumpet, vocals
Pat Calpin - guitar, vocals

Catch 22 (band) live albums
2004 live albums
Victory Records live albums